Eucalyptus calyerup is a tree that is endemic to a small area in the south-west of Western Australia. It has rough, fibrous bark on the lower part of the trunk, smooth bark above, elliptic to lance-shaped adult leaves, flower buds in groups of seven, creamy-yellow flowers and conical to bell-shaped fruit.

Description
It has smooth pale cream to pale pink bark above a dark grey stocking of rough bark on the lowest  of the trunk. Flowering occurs between October and December and the flowers are creamy yellow.

Taxonomy and naming
Eucalyptus calyerup was first formally described in 2002 by Nathan K. McQuoid and Stephen Hopper from a specimen collected from near Calyerup Rocks, east of Jerramungup. The description was published in the journal Nuytsia. The specific epithet (calyerup) refers to the type location. The ending -ensis is a Latin suffix "denoting place, locality [or] country".

This species is possibly a stabilised hybrid between E. occidentalis and E. platypus, although the latter species does not occur in the same location.

Distribution and habitat
This eucalypt is found around rocky outcrops in the Great Southern region of Western Australia between Katanning and Jerramungup where it grows in sandy-loam soils over granite.

Conservation
This species is classified as "Priority One" by the Government of Western Australia Department of Parks and Wildlife, meaning that it is known from only one or a few locations which are potentially at risk.

Use in horticulture
Eucalyptus calyerup has been used extensively by the local Landcare group and has been shown to be resistant to lerp attack.

See also
List of Eucalyptus species

References

Eucalypts of Western Australia
Trees of Australia
calyerup
Myrtales of Australia
Plants described in 2002
Taxa named by Stephen Hopper